Rikard Lindroos (born 12 July 1985) is a Finnish footballer who represents Vaasan Palloseura of Veikkausliiga. Came from VIFK to the beginning of the 2009 season.

References
Football

1985 births
Living people
Finnish footballers
Association football midfielders
Vaasan Palloseura players